The acronym DFX may refer to:

DFX/ Digital FX
Delta Force Xtreme
Cosworth DFX
DFx (in Engineering), refers to Design For all desirable attributes:
Design for manufacturability
 Design for assembly
Design for Inspection
Design for test
Design for X